Ostrów Island is an island, located in the delta of Vistula river, within the city limits of Gdańsk in northern Poland. Administratively, it is located within the district of Młyniska.

The northern border of the island is formed by the waters of Port Channel (Gdańsk), while the southern border is a branch of the Vistula river, called Martwa Wisła.

The Ostrow Island belongs to Gdańska Stocznia Remontowa, a prosperous industrial enterprise and Stocznia Gdańsk, a group of Stocznia Gdynia.

During World War II, Nazi Germans operated a subcamp of the Stutthof concentration camp on the island from October 1944 to March 1945, in which they subjected around 100 Jewish women to forced labour.

References

External links 
Map of Ostrow Island
Homepage of Gdanska Stocznia Remontowa

Gdańsk
Islands of Poland
Landforms of Pomeranian Voivodeship